Chepos also regionally known as Uchepos is a dish in Mexican cuisine, a tamal made with tender maize (corn), which sometimes is added to milk. It has a sweet taste and its consistency is soft. The chepo can be served on its own, or with green tomatillo salsa or tomato cooked and accompanied by fresh cheese or sour cream.  

As a dessert, it is usually served and bathed in sweetened condensed milk.

Although it is considered to have originated in the Mexican state of Michoacan, chepo can be found in other states of the republic where it is called corn tamal. In other regions of Central America it is also called corn tamal. In some regions in South America these tamales are called humitas where the recipes may call for some spices, raisins, other sweet ingredients such as cajeta blanca/arequipe/dulce de leche/manjar, etc.

Method of preparation 

To prepare uchepos for about four people, it is necessary that you have

 12 fresh sweet ears of corn,
 1 teaspoon salt and
 fresh corn leaves.

Carefully remove the husks from the ears of corn trying to keep the husks whole and set aside. Remove the silk from the corn. With a sharp knife scrap all the kernels from the cobb. Grind the sweet corn using a grain mill. If you have no access to a grain mill, you can use a blender. It works better when it is done in a blender with enough power to blend the corn to a paste without having to add any liquid.  When the corn is ground, add the salt and mix. Wash the reserved husk and dry them with paper towels. Spread about four tablespoons of the corn paste on each husk leaving about 1/2 inch from the edges. Fold the husks in the traditional tamale fold. Steam the uchepos in a tamale steamer form 45–60 minutes. Test to uchepos by taking one uchepo out of the steamer, open the husks and let it cool for 1–2 minutes. Take the uchepo and they are done when they do not taste like raw corn any longer. 
Some people claim that they add butter, sugar and/or milk to the uchepos. That is very unlikely that it is an original recipe as the uchepos are from the Purepecha cuisine where the use of butter is negligent and the corn from Michoacan, the Purepechas native territory, is sweet by nature and there is no need to add any sweetener. Uchepos are served with tomatillo salsa, jocoque (a type of sour cream/curd made from fresh milk) and queso fresco. In other instances, uchepos are used instead of tortillas when people eat pork ribs in salsa verde.

External links 

 Uchepo

Maize dishes
Mexican cuisine